The following is a list of sports/ games, divided by category.

According to the World Sports Encyclopaedia (2003), there are 8,000 indigenous sports and sporting games.

Physical sports

Acrobatic sports 

 Breakdancing
 Competitive dancing
 Cheerleading
 Dancesport
 Dragon dance and Lion dance
 Figure skating
 Freerunning
 Gymnastics
 High kick
 Parkour
 Pole sports
 Stunt
 Trampolining
 Winter guard

Air sports

Aerobatics
Air racing
Cluster ballooning
Hopper ballooning

Gliding
Hang gliding
Powered hang glider
Human powered aircraft
Model aircraft
Parachuting
Banzai skydiving
BASE jumping
Skysurfing
Wingsuit flying
Paragliding
Paramotoring
Ultralight aviation

Archery

 3D archery
 Field archery
 Flight archery
 Gungdo
 Indoor archery
 Kyūdō
 Mounted archery
 Popinjay
 Run archery
 Target archery

Board sports

Sports that are played with some sort of board as the primary equipment.

Catching games

 Dodgeball
 Frisbee
 Gaga
 Keep away
 Kin-Ball
 Newcomb ball
 Quidditch
 Yukigassen

Climbing

 Abseiling
 Aid climbing
 Ice climbing
 Mixed climbing
 Mountaineering
 Rock climbing
 Bouldering
 Deep-water soloing
 Sport climbing
 Traditional climbing
 Speed climbing
 Sawanobori
 Other
 Canyoning (Canyoneering)
 Coasteering
 Hiking
 Rope climbing
 Pole climbing

Cycling

Sports using bicycles or unicycles.

Bicycle

 Artistic cycling
 BMX
 Cyclo-cross
 Cycle polo
 Cycle speedway
 Downhill mountain biking
 Dirt jumping
 Freestyle BMX
 Hardcourt Bike Polo
 Mountain biking
 Road bicycle racing
 Track cycling
 Underwater cycling
 cycle ball

Skibob

 Skibobbing

Unicycle

 Mountain unicycling
 Street unicycling
 Unicycling
 Unicycle basketball
 Unicycle hockey
 Unicycle trials

Combat sports: wrestling and martial arts

A combat sport is a competitive contact sport where two combatants fight against each other using certain rules of engagement.

Grappling

Striking

Mixed or hybrid

Weapons

Other

Flying disc sports

 Disc dog
 Disc golf
 Disc golf (urban)
 Dodge disc
 Double disc court
 Freestyle
Fricket
Frisbee
 Goaltimate
 KanJam
 Guts
 Flutterguts
 Hot box
 Ultimate

Gymnastics

Competitive yoga

Ice sports
Ice Tennis
 Bandy
 Rink bandy
 Barrel jumping
 Broomball
 Crokicurl
 Curling
 Figure skating
 Single skating
 Pair skating
 Ice dancing
 Synchronized skating
 Four skating
 Ice theatre
 Ice cross downhill
 Ice football
 Ice baseball
 Ice hockey
 Sledge hockey
 Spongee
 Ice yachting
 Moscow broomball
 Ringette
 Rinkball
 Speed skating
 Short track speed skating
 Long track speed skating
 Ice stock sport

Kite sports
 Hang gliding
 Kite buggy
 Kite fighting
 Kite landboarding
 Kitesurfing
 Parasailing
 Snow kiting
 Sport kite (Stunt kite)

Mixed discipline

Decathlon, heptathlon, and the pentathlons consist of ten, seven, and five-component contests that are scored together using one points system.
 Adventure racing
 Aquathlon
 Biathlon
 Duathlon
 Decathlon
 Heptathlon
 Icosathlon
 Modern pentathlon
 Pentathlon
 Tetrathlon
 Triathlon

Orienteering family
  Amateur radio direction finding (Radio Orienteering)
 Geocaching
 Geohashing
 Letterboxing
 Orienteering
 Rogaining
 Waymarking

Parkour/Freerunning 
Sport Parkour and Freerunning are empirically measured competitions of skill, speed or style on an obstacle based course. Self expression, demonstration of control and power are measured.

 Freerunning
 Martial Arts Tricking
 Ninja Warrior 
 Obstacle racing (OCR)
 Parkour
 Trampolining
 World Chase Tag

Running

 Endurance
 5K run
 10K run
 Cross-country running
 Half marathon
 Marathon
 Road running
 Ekiden
 Tower running
 Ultramarathon
 Snowshoe running
 Fell running
 Trail running
 Mountain running 
 Skyrunning
 Sprint
 Hurdles

Sailing

 Dinghy sailing
 Ice yachting
 Kiteboarding
 Land sailing
 Land windsurfing
 Sailing
 Windsurfing
 Wing foiling
 Yacht racing

Snow sports
 Broomball (outdoors, snow)

Skiing

 Alpine skiing
 Downhill
 Super-G
 Giant slalom
 Slalom
 Alpine skiing combined
 Freestyle skiing
 Aerials
 Moguls
 Halfpipe
 Slopestyle
 Ski cross
 Ski ballet
 Speed skiing
 Nordic skiing
 Cross-country skiing
 Ski jumping
 Nordic combined
 Telemark skiing
 Ski mountaineering
 Ski touring
 Skijoring

Sled sports

 Bobsleigh
 Luge
 Shovel racing
 Skibobbing
 Skeleton
 Toboggan

Shooting sports

Sports using guns (firearms, air guns, etc.).

Individual
 Clay pigeon shooting
 Skeet shooting
 Trap shooting
 Sporting clays
 Slingshotting
 Bullseye shooting
 Rifle
 ISSF rifle events
 Fullbore target rifle
 High power rifle
 Benchrest shooting
 Paralympic rifle events
 Handgun
 ISSF pistol events
 Paralympic pistol events
 Field shooting
 Precision rifle competition
 Precision Rifle Series
 Field target
 Metallic silhouette shooting
 ICFRA Palma and F-Class
 Plinking
 Practical shooting
 International Practical Shooting Confederation (IPSC)
 International Defensive Pistol Association (IDPA)
 Multigun
 Cowboy action shooting
 Olympic dueling
 Match crossbow

Athletic hybrid
 Modern pentathlon
 Biathlon
 Summer biathlon
 Ski field shooting
 Field running
 Moose biathlon
 Target sprint
 Pistol skiing
 Orienteering shooting
 Military patrol
 Underwater target shooting
 Water baseball
 Air baseball
 Ice baseball

Skirmish
 Airsoft
 Laser tag
 Paintball

Stacking
 Card stacking
 Cup stacking
 Dice stacking
 Sport stacking

Street sports
 Free running
 Freestyle footbag
 Freestyle football
 Powerbocking
 Parkour
 Scootering
 Street workout

Strength sports
 Strongman

Tag games

 Atya-patya
 Bo-taoshi
 British Bulldog (American Eagle; Australian Dingo)
 Capture the flag
 Darebase
 Hana Ichi Monme
 Hide and seek
 Jugger
 Kabaddi
 Kho kho
 Kick the can
 Langdi
 Marco Polo
 Oztag
 Red rover
 Tag
 World Chase Tag

Walking
 Backpacking (hiking)
 Bushwhacking
 Hiking
 Racewalking
 Walking

Aquatic and paddle sports
These sports use water (a river, pool, etc.).

Canoeing
Canoeing
Outrigger canoeing

Kayaking

 Creeking
 Flyak
 Freeboating
 Sea kayaking
 Squirt boating
 Surf kayaking
 Whitewater kayaking

Rafting

 Rafting
 White water rafting

Rowing
 Rowing (sport)
 Gig racing
 Coastal and ocean rowing
 Surfboat
 Single scull

Other paddling sports
 Dragon boat racing
 Stand up paddle boarding

Aquatic ball sports

Surface
 Water polo
 Canoe polo
 Stone skipping
 Waboba

Underwater
 Underwater football
 Underwater rugby
 Underwater hockey
 Underwater ice hockey

Competitive swimming

 Backstroke
 Breaststroke
 Butterfly stroke
 Freestyle swimming
 Individual medley
 Synchronized swimming
 Medley relay

Kindred activities
 Bifins (finswimming)
 Surface finswimming

Subsurface and recreational

 Apnoea finswimming
 Aquathlon (underwater wrestling)
 Freediving
 Immersion finswimming
 Scuba diving
 Spearfishing
 Snorkelling
 Sport diving (sport)
 Underwater orienteering
 Underwater photography (sport)
 Underwater target shooting

Diving
 Cliff diving
 Diving

Weightlifting

 Basque traditional weightlifting
 CrossFit
 Highland games
 Kettlebell lifting
 Olympic weightlifting
 Powerlifting
 Strength athletics (strongman)
 Steinstossen

Motorsports
Sports involving the use of motorized vehicles

 Air racing

Auto racing

Motorboat racing

 Drag boat racing
 F1 powerboat racing
 Hydroplane racing
 Jet sprint boat racing
 Offshore powerboat racing
 Personal water craft

Motorcycle racing

ATV racing

 All-terrain vehicle competition

Marker sports
Airsoft
Archery
Paintball
Darts

Overlapping sports
Sports falling into two or more categories.

Chess boxing
Motoball
Whirlyball

Other
Singing
Band
Marching band
Beatboxing

Sports involving animals

Dog sports 
Sports in which dogs participate.

Equestrian sports 

Sports using a horse.

Fishing 

 Angling
 Big-game fishing
 Casting
 Noodling
 Spearfishing
 Sport fishing
 Surf fishing
 Rock fishing
 Fly fishing
 Ice fishing
 Bass fishing

Hunting 

Sometimes considered blood sports.
 Beagling
 Big game hunting
 Boar hunting
 Deer hunting
 Fox hunting
 Wolf hunting

Rodeo-originated 

Sports that have originated from rodeos in the old Western Americas.
 Bullriding
 Miniature Bull Riding
 Barrel Racing
 Bronc Riding
 Saddle Bronc Riding
 Bareback Bronc Riding
 Pole bending
 Roping
 Breakaway Roping
 Tie-down Roping
 Team Roping
 Steer Roping
 Steer riding
 Steer Wrestling
 Goat Tying

Ball games

Bat-and-ball games

Invasion games

Sports in which the method of scoring is through goals.

Basketball family

 Basketball
 3x3 basketball
 Beach basketball
 Deaf basketball
 Donkey basketball
 Rezball
 Streetball
 Unicycle basketball
 Water basketball
 Wheelchair basketball
 Cestoball
 Flickerball
 Korfball
 Netball
 Fastnet
 Indoor netball
 Ringball
 Slamball
uball
haloball

Football family

Handball family

 Balle à la main
 Ballon au poing
 Downball
 Four Square or FS Handball
 Beach handball
 Czech handball
 Field handball
 Goalball
 Spikeball
 Tchoukball
 Torball
 Water polo
 Wheelchair handball
 Rollball

Stick and ball family
 Hornussen

Hockey

Hurling and shinty

 Cammag
 Hurling
 Camogie
 Shinty
 Composite rules shinty-hurling

Lacrosse
 Lacrosse
 Box lacrosse
 Field lacrosse
 Intercrosse
 Polocrosse
 Women's lacrosse

Polo
 Polo
Bicycle polo
 Canoe polo
 Cowboy polo
 Elephant polo
Hobby horse polo
Segway polo
Yak polo

Net and wall games

Games involving opponents hitting a ball over a net using a racket, or other piece of equipment, or merely gloved/barehanded:

Games involving opponents hitting a ball against a wall/walls using a racket, or other piece of equipment, or merely gloved/barehanded:

Pilota family

 American handball
 Australian handball
 Basque pelota
 Jai alai
 Fives
 Eton fives
 Rugby fives
 Frisian handball
 Four square
 Gaelic handball
 Jeu de paume
 Longue paume
 Palla
 Pallone
 Patball
 Roundnet
 Valencian pilota
 Llargues

Racket (or racquet) sports

Sports that use a netted racket
 Badminton
 Ball badminton
 Frontenis
 Battledore and shuttlecock
 Crossminton (previously "Speedminton")
 Qianball
 Racketlon (a series of other racket and paddle sports)
 Rackets
 Racquetball
 Real tennis
 Road tennis
 Soft tennis
 Speed-ball
 Squash
 Hardball squash
 Squash tennis
 Stické
 Tennis
 Tennis polo
 Touchtennis

Sports that use a non-netted racket, or paddle
 Basque pelota
 Beach tennis
 The Downside Ball Game
 Four wall paddleball
 Matkot
 Miniten
 One wall paddleball
 Paddle ball
 Paddle tennis
 Padel
 Paleta Frontón
 Pan Pong
 Pelota mixteca
 Pickleball
 Pitton
 Platform tennis
 Sphairee
 Stoolball
 Table squash
 Table tennis (Ping Pong)

Mind sports

Requiring little or no physical exertion or agility, mind sports are often not considered true sports. Some mind sports are recognised by sporting federations.
The following list is intended to represent anything that is likely to be referred to as a mind sport, not to argue their validity as sports.

Card games

 Contract bridge
 Hanafuda
 Poker
 Classic poker
 Omaha
 Online poker
 Texas hold'em
 Skat
 Truco
 Whist

Esports

 Battle royale game
 Combat flight simulation game
 Digital collectible card game
 Fighting game
 First-person shooter
 Multiplayer online battle arena
 Real-time strategy
 Rhythm game
 Sim racing
 Sports video game
 Third-person shooter
 Tile-matching video game
 Virtual reality game

Speedcubing
 Speedcubing
2x2x2
 3x3x3
 3x3x3 One-Handed
 4x4x4
 5×5×5
 6×6×6
 7×7×7
 Megaminx
 Pyraminx
 Rubik's Clock
 Skewb
 Square-1

Strategy board games

Other
 Competitive programming
 Debating
 Fantasy sport
 Quizzing

Competitive model sports
 Mini 4WD
 Model aircraft racing
 Model yacht racing
 Neppis

Remote control
 Drone racing
 Model aerobatics
 RC racing
 Robot combat
 Robot football
 Slot car racing

Different classification
Potentially other sports are listed here.

Air sports
 Banzai skydiving
 Bungee jumping
 Hot air ballooning

Athletics (track and field)

 Athletics
 Track and field
 Steeplechase
 Cross country
 Jumping
 Triple jump
 Long jump
 High jump
 Pole vault
  Throwing
 Boomerang
 Discus
 Hammer throw
 Javelin
 Shot put
 Racewalking

Electronic sports
Sports played using electronic devices.
 Combat robot
 Competitive programming
 Contesting
 Fitness game
 Radio-control vehicles
 Video gaming

Endurance sports
 Chariot racing
 Cross-country skiing
 Cycling
 Iditarod
 Long-distance running
 Rowing
 Swimming
 Wheelchair racing
 Wood chopping

Skating sports
 Bandy
 Rink bandy
 Figure skating
 Single skating
 Pair skating
 Ice dancing
 Synchronized skating
 Four skating
 Ice theatre
 Ice cross downhill
 Ice dancing
 Ice hockey
 Ice skating
 Inline skating
 Aggressive inline skating
 Freestyle slalom skating
 Inline speed skating
 Roller in-line hockey
 Inline skater hockey
 Roller skating
 Artistic roller skating
 Roller derby
 Rink hockey
 Ringette
 Rinkball
 Speed skating
Ice skating marathon
Long-track speed skating
 Short track speed skating
 Tour skating

Snowsports

 Boardercross
 Freestyle snowboarding

 Snowboarding
 Ski flying
 Skibob
 Snowshoe running
 Skiboarding
See #Skiing

Strength sports
Sports mainly based on sheer power.
 Arm wrestling

 CrossFit
 Highland games
 Caber toss
 Sheaf toss
 Stone put
 Weight throw
 Olympic weightlifting
 Powerlifting
 Rock climbing
 Strongman
 Thumb wrestling
 Toe wrestling
 Tug-o-war
 Wood chopping
 Wood splitting
 Zourkhaneh
 Calisthenics

Table sports
 Air hockey
 Backgammon
 Beer Pong
  Carrom Nok Hockey
 Chess
 Connect Four
 Cue sports (a.k.a Billiards)
 Draughts (a.k.a. checkers)
 Dominoes
 Headis
 Janggi
 Mahjong (a.k.a. Taipei)
 Paper Football
 Reversi (a.k.a. Othello)
 Scrabble
 Shogi
 Subbuteo
 Table football
 Table hockey
 Table tennis (a.k.a. ping pong)
  Table Shuffleboard/Sling Puck
 Teqball
 Xiangqi

Target sports
Sports where the main objective is to hit a certain target.

Cue sports

Golf

 Beach golf
 Clock golf
 Codeball
 Dart golf
 Disc golf
 Footgolf
 GolfCross
 Hickory golf
 Indoor golf
 Long drive
 Match play
 Miniature golf
 Park golf
 Pitch and putt
 Sholf
 Shotgun start
 Skins game
 Snow golf
 Speed golf
 Stroke play
 Swingolf
 Topgolf
 Urban golf

Team sports
Sports that involve teams.

Windsports
Sports which use the wind (apart from sailing):

 Kite flying
 Parachuting
 Hot air balloon racing

Fictional sports

Fictional sports that are played in real life:

43-Man Squamish
Calvinball
Quidditch (Harry Potter)
Swiss Guyball
BASEketball
 Brockian Ultra-Cricket
Hunger Games 
Whack-bat 
Blitzball

Miscellaneous sports

See also
Individual sport
List of sports video games
List of types of games
Team sport

References

List of sports